Seneca River may refer to:

Seneca River (New York)
Seneca River (South Carolina)
Seneca River (Virginia)